Liu Qiong (16 October 1913 – 28 April 2002) was a Chinese film director and actor.

Selected filmography

As director
 A Fishing Girl Singer (1983)
 Ashima (1964)
 Military Depot No. 51 (1961)
 Master Qiao Mounts the Sedan (1959)
 The Big Wave (1958)
 Ode to Youth (1953)
 A Bachelor is Born (1952)
 The Insulted and Injured (1950)

As actor
 Once Upon a Time in Shanghai (1998)
 The Dream is not a Dream (1993)
 Amid the Howling Wind (1990)
 Sunset, The (1986)
 The Herdsman (1982)
 Woman Basketball Player No. 5 (1957)
 The Fiery Phoenix (1951)
 The Soul of China (1948)
 Family (1941) - Gao Juemin
 On Stage and Backstage (1937)
 The Lost Pearl (1937)
 New Women (1935)
 The Big Road (1934)

External links
 
Liu Qiong at the Chinese Movie Database

Film directors from Beijing
1913 births
2002 deaths
20th-century Chinese male actors
Chinese male film actors
Male actors from Beijing
Chinese male silent film actors
Deaths from cancer in the People's Republic of China
Deaths from liver cancer